Sillano is a frazione of the  comune (municipality) of Sillano Giuncugnano in the Province of Lucca in the Italian region Tuscany, located about  northwest of Florence and about  northwest of Lucca.  It was a separate comune until 1 January 2015

External links 
 

Cities and towns in Tuscany